This is a list of helicopter airlines. These are notable airlines which provide transport for passengers or cargo, or both, with fleets that comprise a significant proportion of helicopters.

Helicopter airlines

In operation

Defunct or renamed

Services offered
Some companies focus solely on winning ongoing contracts in a single industry sector, such as oil & gas. Other companies cater to a wider range of clients by offering one-off charter flights on an ad hoc basis. Services can include:

 Aid – disaster relief, humanitarian aid
Agriculture – crop dusting, game monitoring, hydroseeding, livestock mustering, pest control, wildlife management
 Firefighting – helicopter bucket, helitack
 Flight training
 Forestry – heli-logging, stream restoration
 Freight – aerial crane, airdrop; general cargo and mail delivery in remote areas
 Industrial – construction, inspection and maintenance of overhead power lines, pipelines,  mobile phone towers, offshore wind farms, hydropower facilities, and other infrastructure
 Maritime – pilot transfer and other ship-to-shore transport
 Medical – air ambulance, medical evacuation
 Military – aeromedical evacuation, pilot training; airlift, vertical replenishment and other logistical support
 Oil & gas – transporting crews to and from offshore platforms
 Passenger – VIP & corporate charter; scheduled flights from remote areas
 Photography – aerial photography, archaeology, film production, photogrammetry, television news reporting
 Science – water sampling, wildlife monitoring, snow radar, support to research stations in the Arctic and Antarctic
 Search & rescue – air-sea rescue, mountain rescue
 Surveillance – border control, coast guard, police
 Survey – aeromagnetic, mineral exploration, reflection seismology
 Tourism – sightseeing tours, heliskiing

Other helicopter companies
These are companies which do not qualify as airlines, strictly speaking, because they specialise in services other than the transport of passengers and cargo.

See also

 List of airlines
 List of rotorcraft
 List of small airlines and helicopter airlines of Russia

Airline-related lists